"Wanna Be Up" is a song written by Eve von Bibra and Brett Goldsmith and recorded by Australia group Chantoozies. The song was released in May 1988 as the third single from their debut studio album, Chantoozies (1988). The song peaked at number 6 in Australia, becoming the group's second top ten single.

Track listings
7" single (K 492)
Side A "Wanna Be Up" - 3:39
Side B "Little Woman" - 4:06

12" single (X 14596)
Side A "Wanna Be Up"  (12" version)  - 5:20
Side B1 "Wanna Be Up"  (7" version)  - 3:39
Side B2 "Little Woman" - 4:06

Charts

Weekly charts

Year-end charts

References

1988 songs
1988 singles
Mushroom Records singles
Chantoozies songs